Union leader may refer to:
 New Hampshire Union Leader, a newspaper
 the leader of a trade union
 the leader of the Canadian Union Labour, a political party
 the leader of the Polish Labor Union, a political party
 Union Leader (film), a 2017 Indian drama film